Carter Anthony Beauford (born November 2, 1958) is an American drummer, percussionist, and founding member of Dave Matthews Band. He is known for his ability to adapt to a variety of genres, and both his ambidextrous and his open-handed drumming styles. He plays the drums and sings backing vocals in the band. Beauford was ranked number 10 by a Rolling Stone magazine reader's poll in 2010 for greatest drummers of all-time.

Background 
Beauford was first exposed to the drums at age three. At the time, his father had bought tickets to a Buddy Rich concert and could not find someone to watch his son, so he took young Beauford along to the show. Beauford was mesmerized by Buddy Rich on stage.  After that show, Beauford's father bought his son a tin drum set with paper heads, since Beauford showed so much interest in learning the instrument. Beauford began performing professionally when he was nine.

Beauford explains his unusual playing style in his instructional video "Under The Table & Drumming", attributing his use of left-hand-lead on a right-handed kit to playing his own kit in front of a mirror as a child in an attempt to emulate his favorite drummers, like Buddy Rich. He unknowingly set up his drums in reverse of whichever performer and set that he had in mind, in an attempt to make the mirrored image of himself match that of the audience's perspective, as he had seen it on stage and TV. This helped him to become completely ambidextrous at a very early age, albeit by accident.

Secrets, Dave Matthews Band 

Eventually, he joined Secrets, a Richmond, Virginia-based jazz fusion band. Other members included childhood friend and next-door neighbor saxophonist LeRoi Moore, trumpeter John D'earth, vocalist Dawn Thompson, bassist Keith Horne, keyboardist Butch Taylor, keyboardist Dane Bryant, saxophonist Eddie Williams and virtuoso guitarist Tim Reynolds.  Secrets performed throughout Virginia, at places such as The Jewish Mother in Virginia Beach, and at Miller's, the bar in Charlottesville where Dave Matthews worked as a bartender. Beauford also played jazz in Blue Indigo with LeRoi Moore, Sal Soghoian, and George Melvin. Blue Indigo performed regularly at Tokyo Rose and Miller's, and was featured at the Delaware Water Gap Jazz Festival. Eventually, Matthews approached both Beauford and Moore regarding some music he had written that he wished to record. Beauford agreed to perform on a demo, which is how he became involved with the group that was to become the Dave Matthews Band.

Collaboration 
Beauford has also worked with other artists on jam projects, including Vertical Horizon, Carlos Santana, Rashawn Ross, John Popper (of Blues Traveler), Tim Reynolds, Béla Fleck and Victor Wooten; both alone and within Béla Fleck and the Flecktones.

Equipment

Beauford uses a Yamaha Drums Recording Custom drum kit, a Ludwig Alex Van Halen Signature Rosewood snare drum, 6.5x14" with a die-cast hoop on the batter side and a triple flanged hoop snare side, Zildjian cymbals, Remo drumheads, Vic Firth sticks and mallets, Yamaha and Drum Workshop hardware including a Yamaha Hex-Rack since the 2008 Summer Tour and various Latin Percussion cowbells, woodblocks and other assorted percussion equipment.  He also uses FootJoy golf gloves rather than traditional drum gloves. Prior to Vic Firth, Beauford was an endorser of Pro-Mark sticks and even had his own Pro-Mark Carter Beauford signature drumstick.

Beauford has used several Jeff Ocheltree and Ron Dunnett custom metal snares in the past, the most common being a bright purple with gold hardware he used for the better half of the 2000s. Around the 2006/7 tour season, the Dunnetts were replaced by a prototype silver Yamaha metal snare later to be confirmed by BeaufordBuddy.com to be Carter's forthcoming Signature Snare. The Yamaha Signature "Carter Beauford" Snare Drum is still a prototype, not in production.

Drums: Yamaha Recording Custom (first generation): 
22"x18" Bass Drum 
8"x8" Rack Tom 
10"x9" Rack Tom 
12"x10" Rack Tom 
15"x13" Rack Tom 
14"x12" Rack Tom  
16"x14" Floor Tom
6.5x14 Ludwig Alex Van Halen Signature Rosewood Snare
7×10 Pork Pie Mahogany Snare

Cymbals: Zildjian: 
18″ A Custom EFX crash
20″ A Custom Flat Top ride with 6″ A Custom splash
19″ A Ultra-Hammered China
22″ K Custom Medium Ride
14″ A New Beat hi-hats
8″ K splash/6″ Zil-Bel/Custom Bronze Bell
18″ K Dark Medium-Thin crash 
10″ A Custom splash
19″ K Dark Thin crash
6″ A Custom splash/8″ K Custom Splash 
15" K Thin crash
21" A ultra hammered china

Heads: Remo: 
Snare: Controlled Sound X Coated black dot or Ambassador Black Suede, Ambassador Clear Hazy snare side on bottom 
Toms: Pinstripe Clear, Ambassador Clear on bottoms 
Bass: Powerstroke P3 Clear

Percussion: LP:
Jam Block (Red)
Travis Barker Cowbell
Granite Blocks
72-Bar Double Row Chimes
7×13 Dunnett titanium timbale

Sticks: Vic Firth (formerly Promark sticks): 
Carter Beauford SBEA signature sticks 
RUTE606 fiber sticks

Awards 
 Modern Drummer Readers Poll 2003 – Best Pop Drummer
 Modern Drummer Readers Poll 2003 – Best Recorded Performance: Dave Matthews Band: Live at Folsom Field, Boulder, Colorado

References

External links 

Carter Beauford at Drummerworld
Carter's drum kit and equipment list
 Dave Matthews Band Live from The Beacon Theatre on Fuse TV June 1, 2009
Биография Carter Beauford  на русском

1958 births
Living people
African-American rock musicians
African-American drummers
Dave Matthews Band members
American rock drummers
Musicians from Charlottesville, Virginia
American rock percussionists
American jazz drummers
Jazz fusion drummers
Rhythm and blues drummers
Soul drummers
American rock singers
American male singers
American male drummers
African-American rock singers
African-American male singers
Grammy Award winners
20th-century American drummers
Jazz musicians from Virginia
American male jazz musicians